J46 may refer to:
 County Route J46 (California)
 Gyroelongated pentagonal bicupola
 Westinghouse J46, a turbojet engine